Kei Nishikori was the defending champion but chose not to participate this year. Three-time losing finalist Julien Benneteau did not participate either.

David Ferrer won the title, defeating Feliciano López in the final 7–5, 7–5.

Seeds
The top four seeds received a bye into the second round.

Draw

Finals

Top half

Bottom half

Qualifying

Seeds

Qualifiers

Qualifying draw

First qualifier

Second qualifier

Third qualifier

Fourth qualifier

References
 Main Draw
 Qualifying Draw

2015 Singles
2015 ATP World Tour